IEC 60929 is an international standard created by the International Electrotechnical Commission and covers electronic ballasts used in AC supplies with voltages up to 1000 V and with operating frequencies at 50 Hz or 60 Hz. The actual operating frequency may deviate from the specified supply frequency. 

The standard essentially covers the same material as IEC 60921, but it is considerably more complex due to the high frequency aspect of electronic ballasts. Appendix E of the standard defines the DALI, which specifies how ballasts are controlled.

References

External links 
 

60929